1,7-Octadiene (CH) is a light flammable organic compound.

Researchers have used 1,7-octadiene to assist ethylene in a cross-enyne metathesis Diels–Alder reaction.

Plasma polymerized 1,7-octadiene films deposited on silica can produce particles with tuned hydrophobicity.

Known to be incompatible with strong oxidizing agents.

References

External links
 

Alkadienes